Juan Pablo de Laiglesia y González de Peredo (6 August 1948 – 4 March 2022) was a Spanish diplomat. He served concurrently as Secretary of State for International Cooperation and President of the Spanish Agency for International Development Cooperation from 2018 to 2020 and was Secretary of State for Foreign Affairs from July to November 2010. He died on 4 March 2022, at the age of 73.

References

1948 births
2022 deaths
Spanish diplomats
Secretaries of State of Spain
Secretaries of State for Foreign Affairs (Spain)
Permanent Representatives of Spain to the United Nations
Ambassadors of Spain to Guatemala
Ambassadors of Spain to Mexico
Ambassadors of Spain to Poland
Grand Crosses of the Order of the Sun of Peru
People from Madrid